Upatissa was purohita to and a Chief government minister under King Vijaya of Sri Lanka. He built a city Upatissa Nuwara named after himself, which became the second Sinhalese kingdom in Sri Lanka.

He became the King of Upatissa Nuwara for a short period of time after the death of Prince Vijaya until the arrival of the heir to the throne, King Panduvasdeva from India.

See also
 List of Sri Lankan monarchs

External links
 Kings & Rulers of Sri Lanka
 Codrington's Short History of Ceylon
 Short History of Sri Lanka

Sinhalese kings
6th-century BC Sinhalese monarchs
Monarch of Tambapanni
House of Vijaya